Merci Docteur Rey is a 2002 comedy film directed and written by Andrew Litvack. The film stars Dianne Wiest, Jane Birkin, Simon Callow, Jerry Hall, Vanessa Redgrave, Bulle Ogier, and Stanislas Merhar. It is produced by Ismail Merchant and his company Merchant Ivory Productions.

Synopsis
Thomas Beaumont is young man recruited into an illicit love triangle to watch a much older man's sexual liaison, but ends up witnessing what turns out to be the older man's murder. The next day his opera diva mother, Elisabeth Beaumont, informs him that his estranged father has been in Paris... until the previous night when he was murdered.

Seeking help with infamous psychiatrist Docteur Rey, the young man comes across Pénélope, an eccentric actress who has come totally unhinged by the death of Rey. At first mistaking her for the doctor, the young man embarks on a madcap mystery, reminiscent of an Agatha Christie novel, with Paris as the backdrop.

Cast

Critical reception 
On review aggregator website Rotten Tomatoes, with 22 reviews, the film has a rare approval rating of 0%meaning no favorable reviews whatsoeverreceiving an average rating of 3.20/10. The site's consensus is: "This overly wacky farce strains for sophistication but lacks polish and a coherent narrative."

References

External links

Official Film Site

2002 films
Merchant Ivory Productions films
2002 comedy films
French LGBT-related films
2002 LGBT-related films
LGBT-related comedy films
2000s French films